Kathryn Robinson is an Australian journalist, television and radio presenter.

Career

Robinson originally studied economics at Macquarie University and began her career working for Macquarie Bank, before deciding to switch to journalism in 2001 when she completed her master's degree in journalism.

She was a finance presenter on Ten Early News and a regular fill-in presenter for Sydney's Ten News at Five, Ten Morning News and Ten News at Five: Weekend.  She was the presenter of the Friday edition of Ten Late News and news presenter on 6PM with George Negus. Robinson filled in for Kim Watkins on 9am with David & Kim.

in 2010, Robinson co-hosted Good Morning Delhi, a breakfast program broadcast on Network Ten during the course of the 2010 Commonwealth Games, with Brad McEwan.

In January 2011, Robinson was appointed presenter of Ten Late News, where she replaced Sandra Sully and became news presenter on 6PM with George Negus.

In April 2011, she was reinstated as Finance presenter on Ten Early News and presenter for Ten Late News: Friday Edition, with Sandra Sully returning to Ten Late News due to poor ratings for 6PM with George Negus and Ten Evening News.

It was later announced Robinson would join Sydney talkback radio station 2UE in 2013, hosting the breakfast shift alongside Ian Dickson. However, before beginning on air, Robinson pulled out of the role for unknown reasons. She was appointed host of a revamped version of Meet the Press.

She has been a fill in presenter for Carrie Bickmore on The Project and was a regular Friday night panellist on the program.

In 2015, Robinson joined ABC News as a news presenter. 

She is also fill-in presenter on Weekend Breakfast and host of The Drum.

Personal life
Robinson is married to Seven News senior journalist Chris Reason. They became parents to twins, a boy and a girl, in 2007.  The birth was announced on Ten Early News, which Robinson usually presents, the following morning and the following evening on Seven News where Reason is a reporter. Robinson returned to work on Christmas Eve 2007.

References 

Australian television journalists
Living people
Australian radio presenters
Australian women radio presenters
Australian women journalists
Australian television talk show hosts
Year of birth missing (living people)
People educated at Redlands, Cremorne